USS PC-1261 was a  built for the United States Navy during World War II. She was the first ship sunk during the D-Day landings on 6 June 1944, when she was hit by shellfire from German shore batteries.

Career 
PC-1261 was laid down on 20 November 1942 by the Leathem D. Smith Shipbuilding Company in Sturgeon Bay, Wisconsin and launched on 28 February 1943. She was commissioned in May 1943 and was sent to Europe and participated in the Normandy Landings.

On 6 June 1944, PC-1261 led the first wave of landing craft at Utah Beach. While en route to the beach, she was struck by an artillery shell and foundered. She was the second ship sunk on D-Day.

External links 
USS PC-1261 (PC-1261)
NavSource Online: Submarine Chaser Photo Archive PC-1261
Chester County Hall of Heroes: John L. Maguire

 

PC-461-class submarine chasers
Ships built in Sturgeon Bay, Wisconsin
1943 ships
World War II patrol vessels of the United States
World War II shipwrecks in the English Channel
Maritime incidents in June 1944
Ships sunk by coastal artillery